Angelina Tkatcheva (Belarusian: Ангелина Ткачёва) is a Belarusian virtuoso cimbalist. She is regarded as one of the greatest Belarusian cimbel players of all time.

Biography 
She was born in Minsk, Belarus, where she began her musical studies at a very young age. At the age of 10, she received her first prize in the Belarusian competition for young musicians, performing works on cimbel.

After a few years, she continued her studies at the Belarusian State Academy of Music, where she completed her studies in 1983, receiving a diploma. In the same year, she took part in a solo competition of the Soviet Union held in Moscow, in which she received an award. After that, she pursued a career as a soloist, giving concerts and recitals in various cities of the USSR, while at the same time continuing to attend classes at the academy, as part of her postgraduate studies.

Her repertoire includes works by classical, romantic, but also contemporary composers. In 1989 she settled permanently in Greece, which was the occasion to begin a new artistic career, starting collaborations with the Athens Concert Hall, the Greek National Opera, the Athens State Orchestra, the Thessaloniki State Symphony Orchestra, the Orchestra of Colors and the ERT Music Ensembles, while generally collaborating with the Greek Composers' Union. She has also performed at the Odeon of Herodes Atticus and the Pallas Theater, but has also taken part in many music festivals and events.

She has taught at the Athens Conservatoire, the Hellenic Conservatory and the Municipal Conservatories of Patras and Petroupoli.

Discography

References

External links 

 Page on Discogs
 Page on Spotify
 Page on iTunes

Women percussionists

Musicians from Minsk
Living people
Year of birth missing (living people)